Igor Sergeyevich Shitov, sometimes written Ihar Shytaw (born 24 October 1986) is a Belarusian former football right back.

Career

Club
On 5 July 2016, Shitov signed a two-year contract with Kazakhstan Premier League side FC Astana. Shitov left Astana on 3 July 2018 when his contract expired.

On 16 July 2018, Shitov returned to FC Dinamo Minsk.

International
Shitov scored his only international goal against Finland in the 90+2nd minute in a friendly match held on 2 June 2008. The match ended in a 1–1 draw after Toni Kallio scored the equalizer in the 90+4th minute.

Career statistics

Club

International

Statistics accurate as of match played 11 June 2019

International goals

Honours
BATE Borisov
Belarusian Premier League champion: 2009, 2010, 2011
Belarusian Cup winner: 2009–10
Belarusian Super Cup winner: 2011

Astana
Kazakhstan Premier League champion: 2016, 2017, 2018
Kazakhstan Super Cup winner: 2018

References

External links
 
 
 

1986 births
Living people
People from Polotsk
Association football defenders
Belarusian footballers
Belarus international footballers
FC RUOR Minsk players
FC Dinamo Minsk players
FC Torpedo-BelAZ Zhodino players
FC BATE Borisov players
Belarusian expatriate footballers
Expatriate footballers in Russia
Expatriate footballers in Kazakhstan
Belarusian expatriate sportspeople in Russia
Belarusian expatriate sportspeople in Kazakhstan
Russian Premier League players
Kazakhstan Premier League players
FC Dynamo Moscow players
FC Mordovia Saransk players
FC Astana players
Sportspeople from Vitebsk Region